The ice hockey team rosters at the 1968 Winter Olympics consisted of the following players:

Austria
Head coach:  Jiri Hanzl

Canada
Head coach: Jackie McLeod

Czechoslovakia
Head coach: Vladimír Kostka

Assistnat coach: Jaroslav Pitner

East Germany
Head coach: Rudolf Schmieder

Finland
Head coach:  Augustin Bubník

France
Head coach:  Gaëtan LaLiberte

Norway
Head coach: Egil Bjerklund

Japan
Head coach: Tadeo Nakazima

Romania
Head coach: Mihai Flamaropol

Assistant coach: Constantin Tico

United States
Head coach:  Murray Williamson

Soviet Union
Head coach: Arkadi Chernyshyev

Assistant coach: Anatoly Tarasov, Viktor Tikhonov

Sweden
Head coach: Arne Strömberg

West Germany
Head coach: Markus Egen,  Ed Reigle

Yugoslavia
Head coach:  Oldrich Mlcoch

References

Sources

Hockey Hall Of Fame page on the 1968 Olympics

Jeux Olympiques 1968

rosters
1968